Men's double trap shooting made its first appearance at the 1996 Summer Olympics, with Russell Mark becoming the inaugural champion after a strong final. Albano Pera and Zhang Bing won the other medals after a shoot-off with Park Chul-sung.

Qualification round

OR Olympic record – Q Qualified for final

Final

OR Olympic record

References

Sources

Shooting at the 1996 Summer Olympics
Men's events at the 1996 Summer Olympics